The black-tailed leaftosser (Sclerurus caudacutus) is a species of bird in the family Furnariidae. It is found in Bolivia, Brazil, Colombia, Ecuador, French Guiana, Guyana, Peru, Suriname, and Venezuela.
Its natural habitat is tropical moist lowland forests.

Description
Leaftossers are small, plump, ground-dwelling birds with dark plumage and short legs and tails. The beak is long and straight, and the lower mandible is turned up at its tip. The head and upper parts of the body are a deep brown, the rump is chestnut-brown and the tail black. The throat is white, the feathers being edged with brown which gives the throat a scaled appearance, and the rest of the underparts are dark brown. Some other species of leaftossers overlap its range but it can be distinguished by the white throat; the short-billed leaftosser (Sclerurus rufigularis) has a short beak and reddish throat; the tawny-throated leaftosser (Sclerurus mexicanus) has a downwardly-curved beak and cinnamon throat; and the grey-throated leaftosser (Sclerurus albigularis) has a straight beak and a pale grey throat bordered by a cinnamon band.

The voice of this bird is a series of loud "queet" sounds which first accelerates and then slows down and fades away.

Distribution and habitat
The black-tailed leaftosser is found in the tropical rainforests of South America to the east of the Andes Mountains. Its range includes Colombia, Venezuela, Guyana, Surinam, French Guiana, Brazil, Ecuador, Peru and the northern tip of Bolivia.

Ecology
Leaftossers are secretive birds that move through the undergrowth probing the leaf-litter with their long, slender beaks. They are difficult to observe but may be recognised by their calls, particularly at dawn and dusk when they are more vocal. They are usually found singly or in pairs, hopping on the ground and among fallen logs, flicking dead leaves to the side with their beaks. They feed on small invertebrates such as cockroach egg cases, beetles and their larvae, earthworms and ants, and one individual has been observed feeding on a fallen fruit.

Status
The International Union for Conservation of Nature has rated the conservation status of S. caudacutus as being of "least concern", because it has a very wide range and is common in some locations. However, its Amazon rainforest habitat is being degraded and it is likely that the total population of this bird is in slow decline.

References

black-tailed leaftosser
Birds of the Amazon Basin
Birds of the Guianas
Birds of the Atlantic Forest
black-tailed leaftosser
Taxa named by Louis Jean Pierre Vieillot
Taxonomy articles created by Polbot